The women's triple jump event at the 2015 African Games was held on 13 September.

Results

References

Triple
2015 in women's athletics
2015